Meitei, also known as Manipuri, is a Tibeto-Burman language of northeast India. It is spoken by around 1.8 million people, predominantly in the state of Manipur, but also by smaller communities in the rest of the country and in parts of neighbouring Myanmar and Bangladesh. It is native to the Meitei people, and within Manipur, it serves as an official language and a lingua franca. It was used as a court language in the historic Manipur Kingdom and is presently included among the 22 scheduled languages of India.

Meitei language is a tonal language whose exact classification within Sino-Tibetan remains unclear. It has lexical resemblances to Kuki and Tangkhul. 

Meitei language is the most widely spoken Sino-Tibetan language of India and the most spoken indigenous language of northeast India after Assamese and Bengali.
There are  million Meitei speakers in India according to the 2011 census. The majority of these, or  million, are found in the state of Manipur, where they represent just over half of its population. There are smaller communities in neighbouring Indian states, such as Assam, Tripura, Nagaland, and elsewhere in the country. Additionally, there are around 200,000 L2 speakers. The language is also spoken by smaller groups in neighbouring Myanmar and Bangladesh. Meitei is not endangered: its status has been assessed as safe in Ethnologue (where it is assigned to EGIDS level 2 "provincial language"), but is considered vulnerable in UNESCO's Atlas of the World's Languages in Danger.

Geographical distribution

Bangladesh 

The population of Meitei speakers (Manipuris) are found in four districts, namely Sylhet District, Moulvibazar District, Sunamganj District and Habiganj District of the Sylhet Division of Bangladesh. In early times, there were Meitei speaking population in Dhaka, Mymensingh and Comilla also.

Sylhet district 
There are thirteen villages in Sylhet District, which are Amborkhana (Nongthombam Leikai in Meitei language), Nayabazar, Shibgonj, Goaipara, Kewapara, Sagordighirpar (Pukhri Mapan in Meitei language), Baghbari, Laladighipar (Sapam Leikai in Meitei language), Lamabazar (Leichom Leikai in Meitei language), Doxingach, Rajbari (Konung Leikai in Meitei language), Brojonath Tila (Meitei people refer to it as Brajanath Leikai but earlier it was known as Narasingh Tila) and Noyabazar (Sylhet P.S.) among others.

Mouluvibazar district 
Moulvibazar District has twenty-eight Meitei populated settlements, which are Photiguli, Goalbari, Naldhari, Boroiloli (Kulaura P.S.), Ramnagar, Khaspur, Balishira (Shrimongol P.S.), Gouranagar, Puthadhor, Chotodhamai, Patharia, Gourangabil (Borolekha P.S.), Madhobpur, Chaiciri (Nongthombam Leikai in Meitei language), Homerjan, Majhergaon, Shangaon (Hamom Khul in Meitei language), Haqtiarkhola, Shripiire, Bhandarigaon, Chitlia, Noyapattan, Ganganagar, Bhanubil, Katabil Tateygaon (Mange Makhong Khul in Meitei language), Mongolpur (Haobam Leikai in Meitei language), Konagoan (Kamalgonj P.S.), among others.

Habiganj district 
Habigonj District (Chunarghat P.S.) had four Meitei settlement areas, which are Gaborkhula, Abadgaon, Shibnagar and Dudhpatil.

Sunamganj district 
Sunamgonj District (Chatak P.S.) has three Meitei populated settlements, which are Nayanpur, Lakhat and Ratanpur.

India

Assam 

Meitei language is the third most widely spoken language, after Bengali and Hindi, in the Barak Valley region of Assam state of India.

Manipur 
The Indian state of Manipur has the largest Meitei speaking population among all its geographical distribution. Native to as well as predominantly spoken in the state, Meitei language is the official language of the Government of Manipur as well as the lingua franca of the different communities living in Manipur.

Myanmar 
Myanmar has significant Meitei speaking population in Kachin state, Yangon Region, Sagaing Region, Shan state, Ayeyarwady Region, among others.

Name 
The name Meitei or its alternate spelling Meithei is preferred by many native speakers of Meitei over Manipuri. The term is derived from the Meitei word for the language Meitheirón (Meithei + -lon 'language', pronounced ). Meithei may be a compound from mí 'man' + they 'separate'. This term is used by most Western linguistic scholarship. Meitei scholars use the term Meit(h)ei when writing in English and the term Meitheirón when writing in Meitei. Chelliah (2015: 89) notes that the Meitei spelling has replaced the earlier Meithei spelling.

The language (and people) is also referred to by the loconym Manipuri. The term is derived from name of the state of Manipur. Manipuri is the official name of the language for the Indian government and is used by government institutions and non-Meitei authors. The term Manipuri is also used to refer to the different languages of Manipur and people. Additionally, Manipuri, being a loconym, can refer to anything pertaining to Manipur state.

The term Meetei is used by Meitei speakers who want political autonomy from India, so-called "revivalists".

Speakers of Meitei language are known as "Kathe" by the Burmese people, "Moglie" or "Mekhlee" by the people of Cachar, Assam (Kacharis and Assamese) and "Cassay" by the Shan people and the other people living in the east of the Ningthee River (or Khyendwen River). "Ponna" is the Burmese term used to refer to the Meiteis living inside Burma.

Dialects 
The Meitei language exhibits a degree of regional variation; however, in recent years the broadening of communication, as well as intermarriage, has caused the dialectal differences to become relatively insignificant. The only exceptions to this occurrence are the speech differences of the dialects found in Tripura, Bangladesh and Myanmar. The exact number of dialects of Meitei is unknown.

The three main dialects of Meitei are: Meitei proper, Loi and Pangal. Differences between these dialects are primarily characterised by the extensions of new sounds and tonal shifts. Meitei proper is considered to be the standard variety—and is viewed as more dynamic than the other two dialects. The brief table below compares some words in these three dialects:

Devi (2002) compares the Imphal, Andro, Koutruk, and Kakching dialects of Meitei.

Status

Official language status 
Meitei is the sole official language of the Government of Manipur. It is used for all official purposes, except for some interstate cases. Meitei is included among the languages that stand apart of the Eighth Schedule to the Constitution of India, thus granting it the status of a "scheduled language".

Amendment to the script policy 
In 2021, there were changes to the Manipur Official Language Act by the Government of Manipur as follows:

Court language status 

Meitei language was the court language of the historic Manipur Kingdom (Meeteileipak), and was declared as such in the kingdom's 1947 Constitution, before it merged into the Indian Republic.

Recognition by the Sahitya Akademi 

Meitei language was recognised by the National Sahitya Akademi as one of the major Indian languages in 1972, long before it was recognised as a constitutionally scheduled language in 1992. It has been recognised by the National Sahitya Academy for its rich literary traditions.

Scheduled language status 

The Meitei language has been recognised (under the name Manipuri) by the Indian Union and was included in the list of scheduled languages (included in the 8th schedule by the 71st amendment of the constitution in 1992).
The day of the inclusion of Meitei language in the Eighth Schedule to the Constitution of India and making it one of the official languages of the Indian Republic is annually commemorated as Meitei Language Day (also called Manipuri Language Day) on August 20.

Language movements 
In the modern era, several Meitei language movements have been in existence, including the linguistic purism movement, scheduled language movement, classical language movement, associate official language movement. There is a proposal for the language to be granted the elite status of "Classical Languages of India". Besides, it is also proposed to be recognised as an "associate official language" of the Government of Assam. According to Leishemba Sanajaoba, the present titular king of Manipur and a Member of Parliament, Rajya Sabha from Manipur state, by recognising Meitei as an associate official language of Assam, the identity, history, culture and tradition of Manipuris residing in Assam could be able to get protected and preserved.

In the Prime Minister's Office 

Meitei language is selected as one of the 11 Indian languages, out of the 22 official languages of the Indian Republic, to be made available in the official website of the Indian Prime Minister's Office.

In the Ministry of Information and Broadcasting 
Meitei language is selected as one of the 14 Indian languages, out of the 22 official languages of the Indian Republic, to be made available in the Press Information Bureau (PIB) by the Ministry of Information and Broadcasting of the Government of India (GOI). The Meitei language versions of the press releases are presently available in Bengali script, but there is plan of changing the script into Meitei script (Manipuri script) in due course of time.

In the Staff Selection Commission 
Meitei language is one of the 13 Indian languages, out of the 22 official languages of the Indian Republic, selected by the Staff Selection Commission (SSC) of the Government of India, to be made available in the conduction of the Multi-Tasking (Non-Technical) Staff examination across the country. The Staff Selection Commission is one of the biggest job recruiting agencies belonging to the Indian Government. It mainly recruits people to "Group B" (Non-Gazetted Posts) and "Group C" (Non-Technical Posts) in diverse governmental ministries and departments.

In the Ministry of Electronics and Information Technology 
Meitei language is selected as one of the 5 Indian languages, for publishing information on the Indian heritage by the Indian Government's Ministry of Electronics and Information Technology sponsored "Northeast Heritage" Web, besides Hindi and English.

In the National Education Policy 

Meitei language is one of the 28 languages selected across the world, besides French, Sanskrit, Tamil, etc. to be used in teaching and learning in grades (1-5) by the "Unified District Information System for Education Plus" (UDISE+), as per the reports of the Press Information Bureau (PIB). It is a part of the National Education Policy 2020 started by the Union Cabinet of India.

Education 

Besides being a medium of instructions in the educational institutions in Manipur, Meitei language is taught as a subject up to the post-graduate level (Ph.D.) in major universities of India, including but not limited to Jawaharlal Nehru University, Delhi University, Gauhati University, and University of North Bengal.

All India

CBSE 
Meitei language (under the subject name "Manipuri") is one of the 40 languages (including indigenous/local and foreign/international) offered for academics in the curriculum for the Central Board of Secondary Education (CBSE), controlled and managed by the Ministry of Education of the Government of India.

IGNOU 
Indira Gandhi National Open University (IGNOU), the largest university in the world, offers education in Meitei language as one of the 14 major "Modern Indian Languages" (MILs) for undergraduate students.

Assam 
Board of Secondary Education, Assam (SEBA) offers Meitei language subject under the name "Manipuri".
Assam Higher Secondary Education Council (AHSEC) of Assam offers Meitei language subjects, under the names "Manipuri" and "Advance Manipuri".

Meitei language subject is offered by the Government of Assam in the lower primary schools of Assam, since 1956. 
Meitei language subject is offered for the education in the Bachelor's degree in the Gauhati University.

Since 2020, Assam Government is annually granting ₹5 lakh as financial assistance to the Assam Manipuri Sahitya Parishad. Moreover, the Assam government financed  and created a corpus for the development of the Meitei language.

The "Department of Manipuri" (estd. in July 1997) of Assam University in Silchar offers education of Master's degree, Master of Philosophy degree and Doctor of Philosophy degree in Meitei language, under the title "Manipuri".

Tripura 
The Government of Tripura offers Meitei language as "first language" subject at primary level in 24 notified schools throughout the state. It was introduced since 1998. 

In December 2021, Tripura University proposed to the Ministry of Human Resource Development and the University Grants Council (UGC), about the introduction of diploma courses in Meitei language, along with other international languages like Japanese, Korean and Nepali simultaneously.

Phonology

Tone 
The Meitei language is a tonal language. There is a controversy over whether there are two or three tones.

Segments 
Meitei distinguishes the following phonemes:

Consonants

Vowels

Note: the central vowel /ɐ/ is transcribed as <ə> in recent linguistic work on Meitei. However, phonetically it is never [ə], but more usually [ɐ]. It is assimilated to a following approximant: /ɐw/ = /ow/, /ɐj/ = [ej].

Phonological processes 
A velar deletion is noted to occur on the suffix -lək when following a syllable ending with a /k/ phoneme.

Meitei has a dissimilatory process similar to Grassmann's law found in Ancient Greek and Sanskrit, though occurring on the second aspirate. Here, an aspirated consonant is deaspirated if preceded by an aspirated consonant (including ) in the previous syllable. The deaspirated consonants are then voiced between sonorants.

Writing systems

Meitei script 

The Meitei script (romanized: Meitei Mayek), also known as the Meetei script (romanized: Meetei Mayek), used for writing in Meitei language, is one of the official scripts of the Indian Republic. Also known as the Kanglei script (romanized: Kanglei Mayek/Kanglei Iyek) and the Kok Sam Lai script (romanized: Kok Sam Lai Mayek), its earliest known epigraphic evidence of existence dates back to the 6th century CE coins issued by Meitei kings, engraving the Meitei letters, as verified by the National Sahitya Akademi. It was used until the 18th century, when it was replaced by the Bengali script, and reused again massively in the 20th century. Starting from 2021, Meitei script (officially known as Meetei Mayek) was officially used by the Government of Manipur, along with the Bengali script, to write the Meitei language, as per "The Manipur Official Language (Amendment) Act, 2021".

Naoriya Phulo script

Latin script 
Elementary Manipuri (Roman Script) is one of the subjects offered to the students by the The Board of Secondary Education Manipur, BSEM. 
It is a subject categorised under the "Subjects In Lieu Of First Language", for being used in lieu of "Manipuri".
It is a commonly opted subject to the students of the hill people of Manipur.

The Meitei language editions of the Bible in Roman script is very commonly used by the Christians of Manipur.

There exists an informal, but fairly consistent practical spelling of Meitei in Latin script. This spelling is used in the transcription of personal names and place names, and it is extensively used on the internet (Facebook, blogspots, etc.). It is also found in academic publications, for the spelling of Meitei book titles and the like (examples can be seen in the References, below). This spelling, on the whole, offers a transparent, unambiguous representation of the Meitei sound system, although the tones are usually not marked. It is practical in the sense that it does not use extra-alphabetical symbols, and can, therefore, be produced easily on any standard keyboard. The only point of ambiguity is found in the spelling of the vowels /ɐ/ and /a/, which are usually both written "a", except when they occur before an approximant (see table below). The vowel /a/ is sometimes written as "aa" to distinguish it from /ɐ/.

Bengali script 

Meitei in Bangladesh and India currently uses the Bengali script, alongside the Meitei script.

Grammar 
Sentences in the Meitei language use the format Subject + Object + Verb (SOV). For example, in the sentence Ei chak chai (ꯑꯩ ꯆꯥꯛ ꯆꯥꯢ), which translates to I eat rice, the gloss is "ei" (I), "chak" (rice), "chai" (eat).

Nouns 
Nouns and pronouns are marked for number in Meitei. The plural is indicated by the suffixes -khoi (for personal pronouns and human proper nouns) and -sing (for all other nouns). Verbs associated with the pluralised nouns are unaffected. Examples are demonstrated below:

When adjectives are used to be more clear, Meitei utilises separate words and does not add a suffix to the noun. Examples are show in the chart below:

Compound verbs 
Compound verbs are created by combining root verbs each ending with aspect markers. While the variety of suffixes is high, all compound verbs utilise one of two:

Aspect markers appear as suffixes that clarify verb tense and appear at the end of the compound verb. Overall, the formula to construct a compound verb becomes [root verb] + [suffix] + [aspect marker]:

Compound verbs can also be formed utilising both compound suffixes as well, allowing utterances such as pithokningle meaning "want to give out".

Number words

Literature 

The Khamba Thoibi Sheireng, also spelled as the Khamba Thoibi Seireng (lit. Poem on Khamba Thoibi), which is regarded as the national epic of the Manipuris, is a classical Meitei language epic poem based on the ancient romantic adventure tale of Khamba and Thoibi of Moirang kingdom of Ancient Kangleipak (early Manipur). It is the masterpiece of Hijam Anganghal, the "Bard of Samurou", and is regarded as the greatest of all the epic poems in Meitei literature, having a length of 39,000 verses.

Linguistic tradition 

The culture involved with the Meitei language is rooted deeply with pride and tradition based on having respect to the community elders. Young children who do not know about the tales that have been passed on from generation to generation are very rare. Regarding the history behind the ancient use of proverbs that defines the way conversation is held with the Meitei language, it is a way of expressing and telling stories and even using modern slang with old proverbs to communicate between one another.

The Meitei language had its own script. The history behind the Meitei language itself comes primarily from the ancient period of northeastern India.

Literary Awards

Media 

After the birth of Meitei cinema in 1972 as Matamgi Manipur, Maniwood, the Meitei language film industry, began to bring fame and prestige to India at the international level and to Manipur at the nation level. Notable internationally acclaimed and renowned films include 1981 film Imagi Ningthem (first Indian film to win a grand prix award of the Golden Montgolfiere at the Festival des 3 Continents, Nantes), 1990 film Ishanou (screened at the Un Certain Regard section of the 1991 Cannes International Film Festival), the 1984 film "Pebet" (Best Short Fiction Film in the International Short Film Festival, Kolkata 1985), the 2008 film "Nungee Mit" (Best Short Film in 2nd Cine ASA International Film Festival 2009, Guwahati), the 2009 film "Ilisha Amagi Mahao" (Best Director Award in the Cine ASA International Film Festival 2009, Guwahati), 2014 film "Phum Shang" (Best Medium Length Film at 18th International Environmental Film & Video Festival, Goias, Brazil 2016), 2016 film "Ima Sabitri" (Best Documentary Film Award at the 15th Mumbai International Film Festival), 2017 film "Theatre of the Earth" (Winner of Satyajit Ray Bronze Award for the 3rd Best Documentary at the 2nd South Asian Short Film Festival), 2018 film "Fireflies" (Best Documentary Short at Arthouse Asia International Film Festival 2018), "Naapal" (Best Short Film Award at the 1st Guwahati International Documentary, Short and Animation Film Festival), 2019 film "Highways of Life" (Best Film Award at the 8th Liberation DocFest, Bangladesh 2020), "I Rise" (Best Documentary Award at the Mumbai Short International Film Festival 2020), Motsillaba Mingsel (The Tainted Mirror) (Best Director and Best Child Artist awards at the Cochin International Shortfilm Awards 2021, Best Short Film Award at The Himalayan Film Festival 2021), 2020	film "Nawa Seidum" (Outstanding Achievement Award at the Tagore International Film Festival 2020, Best Narrative Film in Moment International 2020), "Samnaba - Merge" (Best Cinematography Award at The Himalayan Film Festival 2021), 2021 film "Class@6pm" (Best Asian Short Film Award at the Golden Leaf International Film Festival 2021), "Monsoon of Life" (Best Film at Unibrow Film Festival 2021 at the MOKKHO International Film Festival 2022), "Beyond Blast" (Best Director of Photography in the Goa International Film Festival 2021 and Best Documentary Feature Film in the Port Blair International Film Festival 2021), 2022 film "Erolnungdagi" (2nd Best Film Award at the 14th International Guwahati Film Festival 2022), "Re-Inkarnation" (DocEdge New Zealand Award in the Dhaka Doc Lab 2022), etc. 

Annual events 
Various annual events are organised to promote, protect and develop Meitei language, in the sovereign states of India and Bangladesh in particular as well as in other parts of the world in general.

Meitei language day 

The Meitei language day (romanized: Meiteilon-gi Numit), formally known as the Manipuri language day (romanized: Manipuri Lon-gi Numit), is annually observed on 20th of August, in memory of the historic day on which the language was included in the Eighth Schedule to the Constitution of India and made one of the official languages of the Indian Republic on 20th August, 1992.

Meitei poetry day 

The Meitei poetry day (romanized: Meiteilon Sheirenggi Numit), formally termed as the Manipuri poetry day (romanized: Manipuri Sheirenggi Numit), is an annual literary event that promotes the Meitei language poetries and honours the contributions of the poets as well as the diverse and distinctive uncommon literary traditions of Meitei language, organised in Manipur as well as in other Meitei speakers populated areas (Northeast India and West Bengal inside India), aiming to popularise and expose Meitei literature (Manipuri literature) to the greater world.

Meitei language festival 

The Meitei language festival, formally known as the Manipuri language festival or the Manipuri Bhasha Utsav, is an annual cultural event that aims to the protection and the development of Meitei language, indigenous Meitei script and Meitei culture in the Republic of Bangladesh. The event is organised by the "Bangladesh Manipuri Sahitya Sangsad" since the year 2008.

Software 

In 2021, Rudali Huidrom, a Manipuri researcher of the EBMT/NLP laboratory, Waseda University, Japan, created a text corpus named "EM Corpus" (shortened form of "Emalon Manipuri Corpus"). It is the first comparable text to text corpus built for Meitei language (mni) and English language (eng) pair from sentences. The writing system used for Meitei language in this corpus is Bengali script. It was crawled and collected from thesangaiexpress.com - the news website of "The Sangai Express", a daily newspaper of Manipur from August 2020 to 2021. In version 1, she created the monolingual data, having 1,034,715 Meitei language sentences and 846,796 English language sentences. In version 2, she created the monolingual data, having 1,880,035 Meitei language sentences and 1,450,053 English language sentences.

EM-ALBERT is the first ALBERT model available for Meitei language. EM-FT is also FastText word embedding available for Meitei language. These resources were created by Rudali Huidrom and are now available at free of cost at the European Language Resources Association catalogue (ELRA catalogue) under CC-BY-NC-4.0 license.

On 11 May 2022, Google Translate added Meitei-language (under the name "Meiteilon (Manipuri)") during its addition of 24 new languages to the translation tool. The writing system used for Meitei language in this tool is Meitei script.

Influence on other speech forms 
Words of Meitei origin occur in other languages, dialects and lects.

In Bishnupriya lect 

Bishnupriya, also termed as "Bishnupriya Manipuri" or "Bishnupriya Meitei", a creole of Bengali language and Meitei language, besides still retaining its pre-Bengali features, uses around 4000 borrowed root words from Meitei language.

In Tangkhul 

"Tangkhul" is a speech form as well as an ethnicity.
The term "Tangkhul" got its name from the Meitei language terms, "Tang" meaning "scarce" and "Khul" meaning "village" respectively.
According to another theory, the term "Tangkhul" is derived from "Thankhul", meaning "Than village" in Meitei language.

In Lamkang/Lamgang 

"Lamkang" or "Lamgang" is a speech form as well as an ethnic group. The term is derived from the Meitei language words, "Lam" meaning "land" and "Kang" meaning "dry". The overall meaning of "Lamkang" is rendered as "people who settled on the dry hilly areas" by the Meitei people. In old Meitei records, the Lamkang people were termed as the "Hiroi Lamkang". The prefixed term "Hiroi" is derived from the Meitei language word for boat ("hi") and work group ("loi").

In Anal/Anan 

"Anāl" is a speech form as well as an ethnic group. The term "Anāl" is derived from the Meitei language term "Anan" meaning "cleanliness". The Anāl people are named so by the Meitei people because of their cleanliness in comparison to other tribes.

Sample text 
The following is a sample text in Modern Meitei of the Article 1 of the Universal Declaration of Human Rights (by the United Nations):

See also 

 Languages of India
 List of languages by number of native speakers in India
 List of Manipuri poets
 Meitei inscriptions
 Meitei literature
 Meitei Language Day
 List of epics in Meitei language
 List of Sahitya Akademi Award winners for Meitei
 List of Sahitya Akademi Translation Prize winners for Meitei
 List of Yuva Puraskar winners for Meitei
 Vikaspedia

Footnotes

References

Further reading 
 1. A Short History of Kangleipak (Manipur) Part-I, by Chingtamlen, 2005
 2. A Short History of Kangleipak (Manipur) Part-II, by Chingtamlen, 2007
 3. A Short History of Kangleipak (Manipur) Part-III, by Chingtamlen, 2008
 4. The Meetei and the Bishnupriya, by Chingtamlen, 2008

Culture 
 Brara, N. Vijaylakshmi. (1998). Politics, society, and cosmology in India's North East. Delphi: Oxford University Press.
 Budha, W. (1992). Indigenous games of the Meiteis. Manipur: Wangkeimayum Publications.
 Kshetrimayum, Otojit. (2014). Ritual, Politics and Power in North East India: Contexualising the Lai Haraoba of Manipur. Delhi: Ruby Press & Co.
 Singh, M. Kirti. (1988). Religion and culture of Manipur. Delhi: Manas Publications.
 Singh, M. Kirti. (1993). Folk culture of Manipur. Delhi: Manas Publications.
 Singh, Saikhom Gopal. (2014). The Meeteis of Manipur: A Study in Human Geography. Delhi: Ruby Press & Co.

Language 
 Bhat, D. N. S.; & Ningomba, S. (1997). Manipuri grammar. Munich: Lincom Europa.
 Chelliah, Shobhana L. (1990). Experiencer subjects in Manipuri. In V. M. Manindra & K. P. Mohanan (Eds.), Experiencer subjects in South Asian languages (pp. 195–211). Stanford: The Center for the Study of Language and Information.
 Chelliah, Shobhana L. (1992). Tone in Manipuri. In K. L. Adams & T. J. Hudak (Eds.), Papers from the first annual meeting of the Southeast Asian Linguistics Society 1991 (pp. 65–85). Tempe, AZ: Arizona State University.
 Chelliah, Shobhana L. (1992). Bracketing paradoxes in Manipuri. In M. Aronoff (Ed.), Morphology now (pp. 33–47). Albany: State University of New York Press.
 Chelliah, Shobhana L. (1994). Morphological change and fast speech phenomena in the Manipuri verb. In K. L. Adams & T. J. Hudak (Eds.), Papers from the second annual meeting of the Southeast Asian Linguistics Society 1992 (pp. 121–134). Tempe, AZ: Arizona State University.
 Chelliah, Shobhana L. (1997). A grammar of Meitei. Berlin: Mouton de Gruyter. .
 Chelliah, Shobhana L. (2002). Early Meitei manuscripts. In C. I. Beckwith (Ed.), Medieval Tibeto-Burman languages: PIATS 2000: Tibetan studies: Proceedings of the ninth seminar of the International Association of Tibetan Studies, Leiden 2000 (pp. 59–71). Leiden, Netherlands: Brill.
 Chelliah, Shobhana L. (2002). A glossary of 39 basic words in archaic and modern Meitei. In C. I. Beckwith (Ed.), Medieval Tibeto-Burman languages: PIATS 2000: Tibetan studies: Proceedings of the ninth seminar of the International Association of Tibetan Studies, Leiden 2000 (pp. 189–190). Leiden, Netherlands: Brill.
 
 
 Singh, Ningthoukhongjam Khelchandra. (1964). Manipuri to Manipuri & English dictionary.

External links 

  
 
 
  
 
  
    

 
Official languages of India
Formal languages used for Indian scriptures
Languages of Manipur
Languages of Assam
Languages of Tripura
Languages of Nagaland
Languages of Bangladesh
Languages of Myanmar
Languages with own distinct writing systems
Languages written in Latin script
Languages officially written in Indic scripts
Lingua francas
Meitei culture
Meitei literature
Sahitya Akademi recognised languages
Standard languages
Subject–object–verb languages
Tonal languages
Unclassified Sino-Tibetan languages